Jon Lee Anderson (born January 15, 1957) is an American biographer, author, investigative reporter, war correspondent, and staff writer for The New Yorker, reporting from war zones such as Afghanistan, Iraq, Uganda, Palestine, El Salvador, Ireland, Lebanon, Iran, and throughout the Middle East as well as during Hurricane Katrina rescue efforts with K38 Water Safety as documented in the New Yorker article Leaving Desire. Anderson has also written for The New York Times, Harper's, Life, and The Nation. Anderson has profiled political leaders such as Hugo Chávez, Fidel Castro, Che Guevara, and Augusto Pinochet.

Career
Anderson began working as a reporter in 1979 for the Lima Times in Peru. During the 1980s he covered Central America, first for the syndicated columnist Jack Anderson, and later for Time, Life, The Nation, and Harper's.

Anderson is also the author of a biography of the Marxist revolutionary Che Guevara called Che Guevara: A Revolutionary Life, first published in 1997. While conducting research for the book in Bolivia, he discovered the hidden location of Guevara's burial from where his skeletal remains were exhumed in 1997 and returned to Cuba.

Bibliography

Literary reception
Che Guevara: A Revolutionary Life has received widespread acclaim as a New York Times Notable Book of the Year and many reprints. In her 1997 critique of the book, U.S. author Jane Franklin claims "Anderson never quite communicates an understanding of why Guevara remains such a powerful presence. Relying too much on secondary sources for his knowledge of Cuban history, he fails to grasp the nature of the revolution for which Guevara, Fidel Castro and so many others were willing to die." Conversely, author Peter Canby states, "Anderson does a masterly job in evoking Che's complex character, in separating the man from the myth and in describing the critical role Che played in one of the darkest periods of the cold war. Ultimately, however, the strength of his book is in its wealth of detail."

In Washington Monthly, Matthew Harwood praised The Fall of Baghdad, writing, "his crisp and lush prose reads more like a work of literature than like reportage. But for all its literary beauty, the book's real power lies in its narrative strategy".

According to left-wing NACLA magazine, Anderson's coverage of Hugo Chávez and Venezuela is rife with errors and distortions.

Personal life 
The son of Joy Anderson, a children's book author and University of Florida professor, and of John Anderson, a diplomat and agricultural adviser for USAID and the Peace Corps, Anderson was raised and educated in South Korea, Colombia, Taiwan, Indonesia, Liberia, England, and the United States. His brother is Scott Anderson, a novelist and journalist, and they have co-authored two books.

He currently resides in Dorset, England, with his wife, Erica, and three children: Bella, Rosie and Máximo.

References

External links
Jon Lee Anderson at The New Yorker
Che Guevara: A Revolutionary Life, by Jon Lee Anderson – Grove/Atlantic, Inc website.

Che Guevara
American biographers
American male biographers
American war correspondents
The New York Times writers
The New Yorker people
1957 births
Living people
Place of birth missing (living people)